Tillandsia albida is a plant species in the genus Tillandsia. This species is endemic to Mexico.

Description 
The Tillandsia albida is a light green/white air plant which tolerates dry conditions. Its flowers are a light cream color . It enjoys bright light and warm weather. It is endemic to Mexico.

Cultivars
 Tillandsia 'Impression Perfection'
 Tillandsia 'Tall Stranger'

References

BSI Cultivar Registry Retrieved 11 October 2009
http://www.rainforestflora.com/store/tillandsia/A10050/albida/

albida
Endemic flora of Mexico